Flourish is a 2006 American film written, produced and directed by Kevin Palys and starring Jennifer Morrison, Jesse Spencer, Leighton Meester, and Ian Brennan.

Plot
The film tells the tale of Gabrielle Winters, a brain-damaged and institutionalized tutor and proofreader who elaborately recounts the disappearance of the sixteen-year-old girl she was babysitting.

Production
Flourish was shot in Los Angeles in May and June 2005.

Release
The film had its world premiere at the 2006 Cinequest Film Festival. Flourish and had a limited theatrical release in San Jose, California on January 17, 2008.

Home media 
The film was released on DVD worldwide on November 14, 2006; in spring 2008, it was re-released worldwide on DVD.

External links
 

2006 films
Films shot in Los Angeles
2000s English-language films
American comedy-drama films
American comedy mystery films
2000s American films